The 1986 Southern 500 was the 21st stock car race of the 1986 NASCAR Winston Cup Series season and the 37th iteration of the event. The race was held on Sunday, August 31, 1986, before an audience of 69,000 in Darlington, South Carolina, at Darlington Raceway, a  permanent egg-shaped oval racetrack. The race took the scheduled 367 laps to complete. At race's end, Hendrick Motorsports driver Tim Richmond would manage to make a late-race move for the lead with seven to go to win his ninth career NASCAR Winston Cup Series victory and his fourth victory of the season. To fill out the podium, Stavola Brothers Racing driver Bobby Allison and Melling Racing driver Bill Elliott would finish second and third, respectively.

Background 

Darlington Raceway is a race track built for NASCAR racing located near Darlington, South Carolina. It is nicknamed "The Lady in Black" and "The Track Too Tough to Tame" by many NASCAR fans and drivers and advertised as "A NASCAR Tradition." It is of a unique, somewhat egg-shaped design, an oval with the ends of very different configurations, a condition which supposedly arose from the proximity of one end of the track to a minnow pond the owner refused to relocate. This situation makes it very challenging for the crews to set up their cars' handling in a way that is effective at both ends.

Entry list 

 (R) denotes rookie driver.

Qualifying 
Qualifying was split into two rounds. Pole qualifying for the race was held on Thursday, August 28, 1986. Per the NASCAR rules in 1986, a one-lap qualifying attempt was utilized. The top twenty cars in pole qualifying were locked into the starting field. The remainder of the cars could stand on their time, or make a new attempt in second-round qualifying. If a driver did decide to make an attempt, their first-round times would be scrubbed. Second-round qualifying was held Friday August 29, 1986. The drivers that had qualified 1st–20th on Thursday were locked-in to those positions and did not have to re-qualify.

During pole qualifying, Richard Childress Racing driver Dale Earnhardt would crash in turn three during his qualifying run. According to Earnhardt, he "just lost it. I just went into turn three too hard and the car got away from me." Earnhardt would eventually qualify 21st, taking the first spot outside of the top 20.

No drivers would fail to qualify.

Full qualifying results

Race results

References 

1986 NASCAR Winston Cup Series
NASCAR races at Darlington Raceway
August 1986 sports events in the United States
1986 in sports in South Carolina